South Stirling is a small community located  north-east of Albany in the Great Southern region of Western Australia. At the 2021 census, it had a population of 22. It is situated at the foot of the Stirling Range. Other close small towns are Mount Barker, Wellstead, and Manypeaks. The town was gazetted in 1959.

It is the hometown of Hockeyroos player Kathryn Slattery, who represents Australia in field hockey.

References

Towns in Western Australia
Great Southern (Western Australia)